Mandel Karlsson, also known as 91:an Karlsson or simply 91:an, is a Swedish comic book character and the main protagonist in the comic strip series 91:an (Eng: № 91). He was created in 1932 by Rudolf Petersson. The series is now published in its own bi-weekly comic book, 91:an, and also as a single strip in the popular weekly women's magazine Året Runt.

Mandel's personality
Mandel Karlsson is based on two people Rudolf Petersson met during his national service at I 16. During his service, he met a blond and ill-tempered Smålandian who turned soft by accordion music and a friendly, short haired person. Some of the attributes were switched and the result was 91:an and 87:an Axelsson. Mandel Karlsson has always been a likeable and sympathetic character: willing to get up to all sorts of youthful mischief, but has a kind soul at heart. During the first three decades, Mandel was very fond of fighting, but a less aggressive, gentler character was developed during the highly successful period of Nils Egerbrandt's work, starting in the 1960s.

Mandel Karlsson is a young man, aged perhaps 20 or 21, doing conscribed military service in the Swedish Army, based at the fictional Klackamo Regiment. His number is "91", thus he is widely known in Sweden as "91:an Karlsson", although in the comic strip itself he is almost always referred to as Mandel (Eng: Almond, an extremely unusual first name), or simply 91:an.

Mandel is the son of Mandolina and Johan Karlsson. Coming from a working-class rural background, he often uses non-standard dialect expressions and vocabulary and possesses a connection to animals. He is a well-known accordionist. Previously, he was also a frequent smoker.

He is very keen on his girlfriend Elvira Olsson. Although they have regular fall-outs, but he is far from "forward" sexually. Elvira often has to take the initiative in romantic matters. He has been known to express a lively interest in other young ladies who meet his acquaintance, although less so than some of his fellow conscripts at the Klackamo Regiment. His sidekick, Lars Fjodor Axelsson, is a brasher, naughtier character, and has frequently tried to rival Mandel for the attentions of Elvira.

Mandel is well liked by the senior officers at the regiment and is soon forgiven his frequent transgression of the rules. He often does chores for Överste Gyllenskalp at home, for example walking his Great Dane, Caesar.

Media adaptations

The comics were adapted into a theatrical play and a series of films.

See also
 91:an (comic strip)
 91:an (comic book)
 The Good Soldier Švejk
 The Life and Extraordinary Adventures of Private Ivan Chonkin

References

 Maurice Horn (1983). The World encyclopedia of comics, Volume 4. Chelsea House Publishers. . pp. 519–521.

Swedish comics
Swedish comics characters
1932 comics debuts
Fictional Swedish Army personnel
Fictional Swedish people
Humor comics
Military comics
Comics characters introduced in 1932
Male characters in comics
Swedish comics adapted into films
Comics adapted into plays
Comics set in Sweden

no:91:an Karlsson
sv:91:an Karlsson